Cannabis Science, Inc. is a biotech company based in Irvine, California. The company was incorporated in 2009 and formerly traded under the ticker CBIS on the Over-The-Counter Bulletin Board until October 2019, when their SEC license was revoked. 

The company's stated goal was to obtain Food and Drug Administration (FDA) approval for cannabis-based medicines, with a focus on treating skin cancer (basal and squamous cell carcinomas), posttraumatic stress disorder and HIV. The FDA has not approved these treatments.

References

Biotechnology companies established in 2000
Companies based in Colorado Springs, Colorado
Biotechnology companies of the United States
Cannabis research
2000 establishments in Colorado
Pharmaceutical companies of the United States
2000 in cannabis
Health care companies based in Colorado